Agranolamia is a genus of beetles in the family Cerambycidae, containing a single species, Agranolamia poensis. It was described by Báguena in 1952.

References

Ancylonotini
Beetles described in 1952
Monotypic Cerambycidae genera